Dicke is a surname. Notable people with the surname include:

 Amie Dicke (born 1978), Dutch artist
 Finn Dicke (born 2004), Dutch footballer
 Pien Dicke (born 1999), Dutch field hockey player
 Robert H. Dicke (1916–1997), American physicist
 Willem Karel Dicke (1905–1962), Dutch paediatrician

See also
 Dick (disambiguation)
 Dicky (disambiguation)

Dutch-language surnames